Linnamäe may refer to several places in Estonia:

Places
 Linnamäe, Lääne County, village in Oru Parish, Lääne County
 Linnamäe, Võru County, village in Sõmerpalu Parish, Võru County

People
 Georg Linnamäe (born 1998), Estonian rally driver

Estonian-language surnames